International Exhibition of Art was a world's fair held in Rome in 1911 to celebrate the 50th anniversary of the unification of Italy in the same year as another world's fair in Turin (which had a more scientific focus).  It marked the beginnings of the National Roman Museum.  The fair's receipts were disappointing over the summer of 1911 because of poor weather and a cholera epidemic.  

The fair was open from 29 April to 19 November 1911, and had 7,409,145 visitors. The participating countries included Austria, Belgium, France, Germany, Japan, England, Russia, Serbia, Spain, USA, Hungary and Italy.

The British Pavilion was designed by Sir Edwin Lutyens. In 1912 it taken over by the British School at Rome, which is still based there.

The Serbian pavilion was designed by Petar Bajalović. Several Serbian and regional artists presented their works, including Marko Murat, Ivan Meštrović, Dragomir Arambašić, Đorđe Jovanović, Toma Rosandić.

References

Arts in Rome
Culture in Rome
World's fairs in Rome
1910s in Rome